This partial list of city nicknames in Tennessee compiles the aliases, sobriquets and slogans that cities and towns in Tennessee are known by (or have been known by historically), officially and unofficially, to municipal governments, local people, outsiders or their tourism boards or chambers of commerce. City nicknames can help in establishing a civic identity, helping outsiders recognize a community or attracting people to a community because of its nickname; promote civic pride; and build community unity. Nicknames and slogans that successfully create a new community "ideology or myth" are also believed to have economic value. Their economic value is difficult to measure, but there are anecdotal reports of cities that have achieved substantial economic benefits by "branding" themselves by adopting new slogans.

Some unofficial nicknames are positive, while others are derisive. The unofficial nicknames listed here have been in use for a long time or have gained wide currency.
 Adamsville – The Biggest Little Town in Tennessee
Athens – The Friendly City
Bristol – The Birthplace of Country Music (shares this nickname with Bristol, Virginia)
Chattanooga
Dynamo of Dixie
The Scenic City
City of Lights
Gateway to the South
Clarksville
Gateway to the New South
The Queen City or Queen of the Cumberland
Tennessee's Top Spot (introduced as a new city "brand" in April 2008)
Cleveland- The City with Spirit
Columbia – Mule Capital of the WorldColumbia, Tennessee - Mule Capital of the World, Roadside America website (accessed January 6, 2008)
Elizabethton – City of Power
Greeneville – Home of President Andrew Johnson
Jackson - Hub City
Johnson City – Little Chicago of the South
Jonesborough – Tennessee's Oldest Town
Kenton – Home of the White Squirrels.
Kingsport – The Model City
Knoxville
The Marble City
Underwear Capital of the World
Lebanon – Appalachian Square Dance Capital of the World
Lenoir City – Lakeway to the Smokies
McMinnville – Nursery Capital of the World
Memphis
Barbecued Pork Capital of the World
Home of the Blues.
Bluff City
Birthplace of Rock 'n Roll
Murfreesboro
The Bucket City
The Boro
Geographic Center of TN
Center of the Universe
Nashville
The Athens of the South
 City of Rocks (reported in the 1880s)
 Minneapolis of the South (historical)
 Music City
 The Protestant Vatican
 Smashville
 Oak Ridge
 America's Secret City
The Atomic City
Shelbyville
Pencil CityCity of Shelbyville official website, accessed January 5, 2008. "We are known as the Walking Horse Capital of the World, and the Grand Champion Tennessee Walking Horse is crowned at our TWH National Celebration annually. Shelbyville is known as The Pencil City because of its historical importance to pencil manufacturing, although today more "writing instruments" than pencils are produced here."
Walking Horse Capital of the World
Wartrace – Cradle of the Tennessee Walking Horse.

See also
 List of city nicknames in the United States
List of municipalities in Tennessee

References

Tennessee cities and towns
Populated places in Tennessee
City nicknames